Science Immunology is a monthly peer-reviewed scientific journal covering all aspects of immunology in any model organism. It was established in 2016 and is published by the American Association for the Advancement of Science. The editor-in-chief is Holden Thorp.

Abstracting and indexing
The journal is abstracted and indexed in:

According to the Journal Citation Reports, the journal has a 2021 impact factor of 30.63.

References

External links

Immunology journals
Monthly journals
Publications established in 2016
English-language journals
American Association for the Advancement of Science academic journals